The Swiss canton and city of Basel issued revenue stamps. The Basel canton issued a total of 22 different stamps in 8 sets, for unemployment insurance and police tax. The city of Basel issued revenue stamps from 1860 to 1975. There were various types for different taxes. Taxes in Switzerland are levied by the Swiss Confederation, the cantons and the municipalities.

Basel-Country

Unemployment insurance (1933)
Swiss: Arbeitslosen-Versicherung
Design: Basel arms.
Total different stamps: 7.
Sets: 1.

Police tax (1952- )
Swiss: Polizei
Design: Basel arms.
Total different stamps: 15.
Sets: 7.

Basel-City

Police tax (1860-)

Swiss: Polizei
Design: Basel arms.
Total different stamps: 128.
Sets: 16.

Bill of exchange (1870-1883)

The first bill of exchange stamp was issued probably before 1870, although it is unknown if this stamp was provisional or not. The amount of tax depended on the value of the bill. Strict regulations applied to how the stamp was to be cancelled.
Swiss: Wechselstempel
Design: Basel arms and basilisk
Total different stamps: 25 (including the provisional).
Sets: 3.

Bordereau tax (1884-1916)

Employers had to file a pay-roll report in the form of an individual periodical reporting leaflet (feuillet de cotisations) for each insured wage earner employed, plus a summary sheet (bordereau) for the entire group. The bordereau lists the name, registration number, and total contribution amount of each worker employed by the employer. Tax stamps were affixed on the bordereau as proof of the payment of social insurance contributions.
Swiss: Bordereauxstempel
Design: 1884 set the Basel arms and basilisk, later sets only the arms.
Total different stamps: 19.
Sets: 3.

General revenue (1884-1914)
Swiss: Stempelmarke
Design: 1884 set the Basel arms and basilisk, later sets only the arms.
Total different stamps: 53.
Sets: 4.

Stocks and bonds (ca. 1883)

Swiss: Obligationen & Actienstempel
Design: Basel arms and basilisk.
Total different stamps: 11.
Sets: 2.

Bailiff office (1897-1944)

The Swiss bailiff or debt collecting office (Betreibungsamt) is a cantonal or communal public and independent office which is responsible for the appropriate legal procedures for initiation of proceedings. 
Swiss: Betreibungsamt
Design: Basel arms and basilisk, numerals. Surcharges.
Total different stamps: 104.
Sets: 6.

Frontier police (1917-1940s)

Swiss: Grenze
Design: Basel arms.
Total different stamps: 29.
Sets: 7.

Registry office (1911-1958)

Swiss: Zivilstandamt
Design: 1911 Basel Ministry, later Basel arms.
Total different stamps: 30.
Sets: 3.

Student accident insurance (1922-1956)
Swiss: Schüler Unfallversicherung
Design: Horse and student, later Basel arms.
Total different stamps: 62.
Sets: 4.

Harbour due (1934-1940s)

From 1934 to the 1940s the Rhine Navigation Office ('Rheinschiffahrtsamt') used 21 different stamps (3 sets) to collect Rhine harbour dues. The exact issue date of series 2 and 3 is unknown.
Swiss: Hafenabgabe
Design: Basel arms.
Total different stamps: 21.
Sets: 3.

Employment tax (1922-1956)
Swiss: Arbeidsrappen
Design: Basel arms.
Total different stamps: 62.
Sets: 4.

Public health service (1937-1942)

Swiss: Öffentliche Krankenkasse
Design: Basel arms.
Total different stamps: 16.
Sets: 4.

War tax (1941)

Swiss: Zentralstelle für Kriegswirtschaft
Design: Basel arms.
Total different stamps: 10.
Sets: 3.

Land registry (1948)
Swiss: Eintrageamt (Grundbuchamt)
Design: Basel arms.
Total different stamps: 3.
Sets: 1.

Chamber of commerce (1951)
Swiss: Eintrageamt (Handelsregister)
Design: Basel arms.
Total different stamps: 5.
Sets: 1.

Bicycle control (1944-1975)

Swiss: Fahrradkontrolle
Design: Basel arms. Stamps with talon.
Total different stamps: 36.
Sets: 1.

Tourism (1942-1956)

The tourism tax stamps of Switzerland deal with the stamps related to the short-term, visitor-accommodation tourism taxes (taxe de séjour). The tourism tax is a public contribution that the guest of a resort or region must pay to help finance the expenses for improving the conditions of their stay.
Swiss: Gasttaxe
Design: Basel arms.
Total different stamps: 5.
Sets: 1.

See also
Postage stamps and postal history of Switzerland
Revenue stamp
Revenue stamps of Basel on Wikimedia

References

External links

Basel revenue stamps - Catalogue chapter by Denis Gainon
PDF library Swiss revenues from the Swiss Postal Stationery Collectors Society (SGSSV)
PDF Tourism Tax Catalogue by Clayton Wallace

Philately of Switzerland
Taxation in Switzerland
Switzerland
Economy of Switzerland